Taylor Holmes (May 16, 1878 – September 30, 1959) was an American actor who appeared in over 100 Broadway plays in his five-decade career. However, he is probably best remembered for his screen performances, which he began in silent films in 1917. Among his earliest starring roles is in George K. Spoor's 1918 production A Pair of Sixes.

Early life
Holmes was born on May 16, 1878, in Newark, New Jersey.

Career

Stage
He made his Broadway debut in February 1900 in the controversial play Sapho, which was briefly closed for indecency. Holmes played Rosencrantz with E. H. Sothern in a production of Hamlet and toured with Robert Edeson. He appeared in stage hits such as The Commuters, The Music Master, and His Majesty Bunker Bean.

Film

Early film appearances included Efficiency Edgar's Courtship and Fools for Luck.

By the 1940s, he was working more on film than on stage. Holmes played a number of memorable roles, particularly in film noir, including the gullible millionaire conned in Nightmare Alley (1947), a shifty lawyer in Kiss of Death (1947), 
and as Gavery, a reptilian disbarred lawyer in Act of Violence (1949). He is also recognized for playing the Bishop of Avranches, who fiercely denounces Pierre Cauchon in the Ingrid Bergman Joan of Arc (1948), Marilyn Monroe's potential father-in-law in the 1953 Gentlemen Prefer Blondes ("I don't want to marry your son for his money, I want to marry him for your money!"), and the voice of King Stefan in Disney's animated feature Sleeping Beauty (1959), Holmes' last credited screen role in which he replaced Hans Conried, who was the model reference for Stefan and recorded only a few additional dialogues. He also played Ebenezer Scrooge in what is largely considered a notoriously bad (and cheaply made) half-hour television version of Charles Dickens's A Christmas Carol, first telecast in 1949.  His final film was Sleeping Beauty (1959), as King Stefan.

Personal life
Holmes was married to actress Edna Phillips and was the father of actors Phillips Holmes, Madeleine Taylor Holmes, and Ralph Holmes.

Only 8 months after the release of  Sleeping Beauty Holmes died on September 30, 1959, at the age of 81.

Legacy
Holmes has a star on the Hollywood Walk of Fame. His interment was is in Culver City's Holy Cross Cemetery.

Partial filmography
Silent
Efficiency Edgar's Courtship (1917) (short) as Edgar Bumpus
Fools for Luck (1917) as Philander Jepson
Two-Bit Seats (1917) as Jimmy Mason
 The Small Town Guy (1917) as Ernest Gledhill
Uneasy Money (1918) as Lord Dawlish
Ruggles of Red Gap (1918) as Marmaduke Ruggles
 A Pair of Sixes (1918) as T. Boggs Johns
It's a Bear (1919) as Orlando Wintrhop
 A Regular Fellow (1919) (*George Eastman preserved) as Dalion Pemberton
Taxi (1919) as Robert Hervey Randolph
Upside Down (1919) as Archibald Pim
Three Black Eyes (1919) as Larry Van Cortlandt
 Nothing But the Truth (1920) as Robert Bennett
The Very Idea (1920) as Gilbert Goodhue
Nothing but Lies (1920) as George Cross
Twenty Dollars a Week (1924) as William Hart
Her Market Value (1925) as Courtney Brooks
 The Crimson Runner (1925) as Bobo (valet)
 The Verdict (1925) as Valet
Borrowed Finery (1925) as Billy
 One Hour of Love (1927) as Joe Monahan
Should a Mason Tell? (1927) (short) as Henry
Their Second Honeymoon (1927) (short) as Henry
King Harold (1927) (short) as Henry

Sound

Lovers' Delight (1929, Short)
He Did His Best (1929, Short)
Let Me Explain (1930, Short)
Dad Knows Best (1930, Short)
 Terry of the 'Times''' (1930) (unconfirmed, uncredited)
 It Happened in Paris (1932)
 Before Morning (1933) as Leo Bergman
 The First Baby (1936) as Mr. Wells
 The Crime of Dr. Forbes (1936) as Dr. Robert Empey
 Make Way for a Lady (1936) as George Terry
 Boomerang (1947) as T.M. Wade
 Kiss of Death (1947) as Earl Howser--Attorney
 Nightmare Alley (1947) as Ezra Grindle
 Let's Live Again (1948) as Uncle Jim 
 Smart Woman (1948) as Dr. Jasper
 Hazard (1948) as Mr. Meeler
 The Plunderers (1948) as Eben Martin
 Joan of Arc (1948) as The Bishop of Avranches
 That Wonderful Urge (1948) as Attorney Rice
 Act of Violence (1948) as Gavery
 Joe Palooka in the Big Fight (1949) as Dr. Benson
 Mr. Belvedere Goes to College (1949) as Dr. Gibbs
 Once More, My Darling (1949) as Jed Connell
 A Christmas Carol (1949) as Ebeneezer Scrooge
 Woman in Hiding (1950) as Jed Connell
 Mr. Belvedere Goes to College (1950) as Lucius Maury
 Quicksand (1950) as Harvey
 Caged (1950) as Senator Ted Donnolly (uncredited)
 Father of the Bride (1950) as Warner
 Bright Leaf (1950) as Lawyer Calhoun
 Copper Canyon (1950) as Theodosius Roberts
 Double Deal (1950) as C.D. 'Corpus' Mills
 The First Legion (1951) as Father Keene
 Rhubarb (1951) as P. Duncan Munk
 Drums in the Deep South (1951) as Albert Monroe
 Two Tickets to Broadway (1951) as Willard Glendon
 Hold That Line (1952) as Dean Forrester
 Hoodlum Empire (1952) as Benjamin Lawton
 Sudden Fear (1952) as Scott Martindale (uncredited)
 Beware, My Lovely (1952) as Mr. Walter Armstrong
 Woman of the North Country (1952) as Andrew Dawson
 Ride the Man Down (1952) as Lowell Priest
 She's Back on Broadway (1953) as Talbot (uncredited)
 Gentlemen Prefer Blondes (1953) as Mr. Esmond Sr.
 Wonder Valley (1953) as Sweetheart's Father
 Untamed Heiress (1954) as Walter Martin
 The Outcast (1954) as Andrew Devlin
 Tobor the Great (1954) as Prof. Arnold Nordstrom
 Hell's Outpost (1954) as Timothy Byers
 Lady and the Tramp (1955) as Jim's Friend #2/Doctor (uncredited)
 The Fighting Chance (1955) as Railbird - the Tout
 The Maverick Queen (1956) as Pete Callaher
 The Peacemaker (1956) as Mr. Wren
 The Book of Acts Series (1957) as High Priest
 The Helen Morgan Story (1957) as Elderly Actor on Train (uncredited)
 Wink of an Eye (1958) as Mr. Vanryzin
 Sleeping Beauty'' (1959) as King Stefan (voice) (final film role)

References

External links

Taylor Holmes portrait section NY Public Library Billy Rose Collection

American male film actors
American male stage actors
1878 births
1959 deaths
Vaudeville performers
Male actors from Newark, New Jersey
20th-century American male actors
American male silent film actors
Burials at Holy Cross Cemetery, Culver City